Copy Cats is a 1988 album by Johnny Thunders and Patti Palladin. It is a set of rock and roll oldies, originally recorded from 1954 to 1969. It was named after being a set of cover versions and as the title of a Gary U.S. Bonds song, "Copycat", which was recorded for the album but not released.

Track listing
The tracks were called "scenes"

Side one – "Act one"
"Can't Seem to Make You Mine" (Sky Saxon) original version by The Seeds, 1965
"Baby It's You" (Mack David, Barney Williams, Burt Bacharach) original version by The Shirelles, 1961
"She Wants To Mambo" (Maxwell Davis, Gene Ford) original version by The Chanters, 1954
"Treat Her Right" (Roy Head) original version by Roy Head and the Traits, 1965
"Uptown To Harlem" (Betty Mabry) original version by The Chambers Brothers, 1967
"Crawfish" (Fred Wise, Ben Weisman) original version by Kitty White and Elvis Presley from the film King Creole, 1958

Side two – "Act two"
"Alligator Wine" (Jerry Leiber, Mike Stoller) original version by Screamin' Jay Hawkins, 1958
"Two Time Loser" (Alden Bunn, Anna Sandford) original version by Tarheel Slim and Little Ann, 1963
"Love Is Strange" (Ethel Cookie Smith, Mac Houston Baker) original version by Mickey & Sylvia, 1956
"I Was Born To Cry" (Dion DiMucci) original version by Dion, 1962
"He Cried" (Greg Richards, Ted Daryll) original  version as "She Cried" by Jay and the Americans, 1962
"Let Me Entertain You (Parts 1 and 2)" (Jule Styne, Stephen Sondheim) original version from the musical Gypsy, 1959

Personnel
Johnny Thunders – guitar, vocals
Patti Palladin – vocals
John Perry – guitar, synth strings
Robbie A. Gordon – guitar
Jimi Haynes – guitar
Henri Padovani – guitar
Billy Rath – bass
Jerry Nolan – drums
Steve Washington – drums
Chris Taylor – bass, drums
Barry Andrews – organ, piano
Pedro Ortiz – tambourines, maracas, percussion
Jim Dvorak – trumpet
Nick Evans – tambourine
John "Irish" Earle – saxophones
Alex Bǎlǎnescu – violins
Maribel La Manchega – castanets
Chrissie Hynde – backing vocals
Jayne County – backing vocals
Blair Booth – backing vocals
Simon Humphries – backing vocals
Paul Long – backing vocals
Judd Lander – harmonica
Anthony Thistlethwaite – harmonica
Technical
Keith Hancock, Ken Thomas (on scene 6) – engineer
Leee Black Childers – cover photography

References

Johnny Thunders albums
1988 albums